American author H. P. Lovecraft (1890–1937) created a number of fictional deities throughout the course of his literary career. These entities are usually depicted as immensely powerful and utterly indifferent to humans who can barely begin to comprehend them, though some entities are worshipped by humans. These deities include the "Great Old Ones" and extraterrestrials, such as the "Elder Things", with sporadic references to other miscellaneous deities (e.g. Nodens). The "Elder Gods" are a later creation of other prolific writers who expanded on Lovecraft's concepts, such as August Derleth, who was credited with formalizing the Cthulhu Mythos. Most of these deities were Lovecraft's original creations, but he also adapted words or concepts from earlier writers such as Ambrose Bierce, and later writers in turn used Lovecraft's concepts and expanded his fictional universe.

Great Old Ones

An ongoing theme in Lovecraft's work is the complete irrelevance of humanity in the face of the cosmic horrors that exist in the universe, with Lovecraft constantly referring to the "Great Old Ones": a loose pantheon of ancient, powerful deities from space who once ruled the Earth and who have since fallen into a deathlike sleep.

Lovecraft named several of these deities, including Cthulhu, Ghatanothoa, and Yig. With a few exceptions, Cthulhu, Ghatanothoa, et al., this loose pantheon apparently exists outside of normal space-time. Although worshipped by deranged human (and inhuman) cults, these beings are generally imprisoned or restricted in their ability to interact with most people (beneath the sea, inside the Earth, in other dimensions, and so on), at least until the hapless protagonist is unwittingly exposed to them. Lovecraft visited this premise in many of his stories, notably his 1928 short story, "The Call of Cthulhu", with reference to the eponymous creature. However, it was Derleth who applied the notion to all of the Great Old Ones. The majority of these have physical forms that the human mind is incapable of processing; simply viewing them renders the viewer incurably insane.

Table of Great Old Ones

Great Ones
The Great Ones are the "weak gods of earth" that reign in the Dreamlands. They are protected by Nyarlathotep.

 Lobon ("The Doom That Came to Sarnath"; H.P. Lovecraft's Dreamlands, John Fultz's "Wizards of Hyperborea")
 Nath-Horthath ("Celephaïs", The Dream-Quest of Unknown Kadath; HP Lovecraft's Dreamlands, "Kadath/The Vision and the Journey")
 Oukranos (The Dream-Quest of Unknown Kadath)
 Tamash ("The Doom That Came to Sarnath;" HP Lovecraft's Dreamlands, "Wizards of Hyperborea")
 Zo-Kalar ("The Doom That Came to Sarnath"; "Wizards of Hyperborea")
 Hagarg Ryonis (HP Lovecraft's Dreamlands, "Wizards of Hyperborea")
 Karakal (HP Lovecraft's Dreamlands, "Wizards of Hyperborea", Mike Minnis' "The Crawler of Pnoth")

Outer Gods
As it is known in the Mythos, the Outer Gods are ruled by Azathoth, the "Blind Idiot God", who holds court at the center of infinity. A group of Outer Gods dance rhythmically around Azathoth, in cadence to the piping of a demonic flute. Among the Outer Gods present at Azathoth's court are the entities called "Ultimate Gods" in The Dream-Quest of Unknown Kadath (called "Lesser Outer Gods" in the Call of Cthulhu RPG), and possibly Shub-Niggurath, the "Black Goat of the Woods with a Thousand Young". Yog-Sothoth, the "All-in-One and One-in-All", co-rules with Azathoth and exists as the incarnation of time in the cosmos, yet is somehow locked outside the mundane universe. Nyarlathotep, the "Crawling Chaos", is the avatar of the Outer Gods, existing as the incarnation of space and functions as an intermediary between the deities of the pantheon and their cults. The only Outer God to have a true personality, Nyarlathotep possesses a malign intellect and reveals a mocking contempt for his masters. Lovecraft himself never made reference to them as the Outer Gods, instead calling them the Other Gods or the gods of the outer hells, as noted in his short story "The Other Gods".

List

Abhoth

Aiueb Gnshal

Aiueb Gnshal (The Eyes Between Worlds, The Child-Minded God) is a mysterious Outer God, who has his abode in a forgotten temple located somewhere in Bhutan. He appears as a formless black void, with seven pulsing orb-like eyes, and is mainly worshiped by ghouls, which tribute him in a defiled cult described in the mysterious Cambuluc Scrolls of the wizard Lang-Fu, dating back 1295 AD. Peering through the eyes of this god, after a hideous and devastating ritual, allows one to see straight into Azathoth's court. It is rumoured that the powers of Mongolian warlord Temujin (Genghis Khan) was a favour of Aiueb Gnshal.

Aletheia

Aletheia (The End of the Darkness) is a god-like entity symbolizing or incarnating the truth. Named after the Greek goddess of truth, it manifests as a vast spiral of manifold titanic hands with a single cycloptic eye in each palm as in the Hamsa, and kilometric wire-like protrusions able to ensnare living beings, replacing their spinal bone in puppet-like fashion. Introduced in Dylan Dog issue 374, In the plot, the entity has clear features of an Outer God rather than a Great Old One as well as an appearance vaguely resembling that of Yog-Sothoth, and is invoked by a deranged prophet with words in Naacal or R'lyehan language almost coinciding with those featured in Cthulhu's invocation, with R'lyeh replaced with Z'lyeh.

Azathoth
Azathoth, sometimes referred to as the "Blind Idiot God", is a dreaming monster who rules the Outer Gods and created them, along with many other worlds, as a dream. Azathoth can't understand anything in his dream, hence his title. Azathoth also shifts in his slumber, causing reality to change.

Azhorra-Tha

Azhorra-Tha is an Outer God imprisoned on the planet Mars, as it fled from Earth after the imprisonment of the Great Old Ones. Its appearance is that of an insectoid to toad-like squid, but its shape continuously changes, emitting an awful buzz. The Mi-Go discovered the prison of Azhorra-Tha the millennia after, and made everything to not reveal its location to any human being.

The Blackness from the Stars

The Blackness from the Stars is an immobile blob of living, sentient darkness, torn from the primal fabric of the cosmos at the center of the universe. It is distinguishable in darkness only as vaguely shimmering oily pitch. Although intelligent, it speaks no known language and ignores attempts to communicate.

The Cloud-Thing

A man-eating cloudy mass, it is an unnamed Outer God at the court of Azathoth.

C'thalpa

C'thalpa (The Internal One) is a huge mass of living sentient magma, located in the Earth's mantle. She is mother of the Great Old One Shterot, and five other unnamed hideous children. She is also served by a race of mole-like humanoid burrowers known as the Talpeurs.

Cxaxukluth

Cxaxukluth (Androgynous Offspring of Azathoth) is one of the Seed-Spawn of Azathoth, grown to adulthood and monstrous proportions. In appearance, Cxaxukluth resembles something of a cross between Azathoth and Ubbo-Sathla: an amorphous, writhing mass of bubbling, nuclear, protoplasmic-gel. He normally dwells alone within an unnamed dimension beyond time and space, unless disturbed or summoned away.

Daoloth

Darkness

Darkness (Magnum Tenebrosum, The Unnamed Darkness) is a mysterious entity spawned by Azathoth, and is the progenitor of Shub-Niggurath.

D’endrrah

D'endrrah (The Divinity) is a sort of blurry female entity of supernatural beauty, dwelling within her obsidian palace located on Mars' moon Deimos. She lives in a hall composed of myriad mirrors that distort her appearance, which is that of a tentacled dark abyss. This Mythos entity is somewhat inspired by C. L. Moore's Shambleau, the illusionary Martian she-vampires of lust.

Ghroth

The Hydra
The Hydra dwells in an alternate dimension, and appears as a vast sea of gray ooze. A multitude of living heads, some human and some alien, sprout from the ooze, sobbing and grimacing as if in great agony.

The Hydra's worshipers trick others into sending the god sacrifices through a pamphlet known as On the Sending Out of the Soul. The last page contains a magical formula for astral projection. When followed, the formula always works as expected, harmlessly transporting the user in astral form to whatever destination is desired. However, unbeknownst to the user, the ritual also brings the subject into contact with the Hydra, which then merges with the individual's astral self, using it as a host. Anyone present where the astral traveler appears is decapitated, the victim's head taken to become part of the Hydra. Afterwards, the astral traveler is returned safely to his or her original body, suffering no ill effects, except perhaps receiving a terrible shock from the grisly scene so witnessed.

Ialdagorth

Ialdagorth (The Dark Devourer) is both the cousin and servant of Azathoth, appearing as a black, shapeless, malevolent mist. The sight of such a fiend is unsettling if not traumatizing.

Kaajh'Kaalbh

Kaajh'Kaalbh is a lesser Outer God, servitor of Azathoth, but secluded in a parallel chaotic-dimension where everything is unstable. The god itself is constantly formed or disrupted and has no true form at all. Whoever attempts summoning this entity needs the aid of a dimensional shambler, and the deity may manifest in a variety of forms, often as an immense lava lake or a vast pool of solidified quicksilver.

Lu-Kthu

Lu-Kthu (Birth-womb of the Great Old Ones or Lew-Kthew) is a titanic, planet-sized mass of entrails and internal organs. On closer examination it appears a wet, warty globe, covered with countless ovoid pustules and spider-webbed with a network of long, narrow tunnels. Each pustule bears the larva of a Great Old One.

Mh'ithrha

An invisible wolf-like fiend similar to Fenrir of Norse mythology (if not coincident). Mh'ithrha (Arch-Lord of Tindalos) is the lord of the Hounds of Tindalos, and the most powerful. Although not an actual Outer God as such, its form and astounding powers defy standard classification. Mh'ithra's eternal battle with Yog-Sothoth is said to be legendary.

Mlandoth and Mril Thorion
Mlandoth is a primal entity or force, not dissimilar to the Nameless Mist or Darkness, although it is uncertain if it is a place, conscious being, or an inconceivable maelstrom of unknown forces and properties outside the perceptible cosmos. It is mentioned in Uralte Schrecken as a kind of prime archetype from which all mythical god-heads are derived.

According to the cycle surrounding these beings, they are a sort of cosmic yin and yang, whose meeting resulted in the creation of all things (although Azathoth is usually attributed to this). Their joinings routinely create and destroy matter and entities. One of the beings created in this way was the inimical Outer God Ngyr-Khorath.

Mril Thorion is an Outer God who, along with Mlandoth, serve as Yin and Yang.
Mlandoth and Mril Thorion were created by Walter C. DeBill Jr., but were suggested years earlier by Clark Ashton Smith.
Walter C. DeBill Jr. is an author of horror and science fiction short stories and a contributor to the Cthulhu Mythos.
He created the parallel Mlandoth Cycle.

Mother of Pus

A Lesser Outer God composed of slime, tentacles, eyes, and mouths. The Mother of Pus was spawned through an obscene mating between a human and Shub-Niggurath. When summoned to Earth, the Mother of Pus seeks refuge in pools of stagnant, foul water.

The Nameless Mist

The Nameless Mist (Magnum Innominandum, Nyog' Sothep) is a "misty, shapeless thing" spawned by Azathoth, and is the progenitor of Yog-Sothoth.

Ngyr-Korath

Ngyr-Korath (The Ultimate Abomination or The Dream-Death) is a dark blue-green mist that causes a sense of terror as it approaches. Once close, an eye of flame forms within. He was spawned by fission of the Great Old One (or the avatar of) ‘Ymnar, and his nemesis is the Elder God Paighon. He coincides with the entity known as the Magnum Tenebrosum.

Nyarlathotep

First appearing in Lovecraft's 1920 prose poem of the same name, he was later mentioned in other works by Lovecraft and by other writers and in the tabletop role-playing games making use of the Cthulhu Mythos. Later writers describe him as one of the Outer Gods. He is a shape-shifter with a thousand forms, most of them maddeningly horrific to humans.

Nyctelios

Once an Elder God, Nyctelios has been punished by his peers—especially Nodens—for having created a race of foul servitors. He has been permanently banished from the Elder Gods' Olympus and imprisoned beneath the eastern Mediterranean Sea, near Greece, in a dark, basalt-built citadel named Atheron. However the exiled deity is not dead but just sleeping, and one day he will rise again from his abyss manifesting himself as a blue, 6-metre tall, cyclops-like monstrosity, with the bulk of his body covered entirely in crawling worms.

Ny-Rakath

A goat-like fiendish horror with bat wings and multiple horns, mentioned as the brother of Shub-Niggurath.

Olkoth

Olkoth (God of the Celestial Arcs) appears as a demoniacal god-like entity able to reincarnate in human bodies if the stars are right (sort of a "Cthulhian" Antichrist). Olkoth may emerge in our dimension through an eyeless, grotesque statue of the Virgin Mary.

Shabbith-Ka

Shabbith-Ka appears as a shapeless, roughly man-sized purplish aura, spitting and crackling with powerful electrical arcs. A sense of power, malignancy, and intelligence accompanies it and persons able to gaze at its form long enough can see a rudimentary face or faces within the glowing mass.

Shub-Niggurath

Star Mother (the great mother of all)

The Star Mother appears as a chunk of yellow-green stone about the size of an infant. Its shape suggests a plump, huge-breasted, faceless female figure. From it extend dozens of pencil-thin root-like strands. It is one of the Larvae of the Other Gods and has no cult, although served by zombie slaves.

Suc'Naath

Suc'Naath is one of the mindless gods which twist and dance in the court of Azathoth. It appears as a formless spinning hurricane-like thing with strings of violet and golden colors across its shape, constantly emitting sickening smacking and screeching noises while showing pain-stricken faces across its body.

Suc'Naath's essence is currently divided into three parts, one in a comet called Aiin, the other in some sort of statue located somewhere in the world, while the third has been genetically passed on for eons through prehuman, and now human races of Earth, mostly in the Middle East. The carriers of the Outer God's powers are said to have done great acts of magic and/or to have been insane. If these three parts are ever to be combined, Suc'Naath will be freed. This entity is served by a small Middle-Eastern cult known as the Golden Hands of Suc'Naath, who collect deranged intellectuals and trained assassins who wish to set Suc'Naath free (they may have connections to the old Hashashin cult as well).

Tru'nembra

Tru'nembra (The Angel of Music) is the name given in the Malleus Monstrorum Call of Cthulhu roleplay game guide to the entity described in H. P. Lovecraft's novel "The Music of Erich Zann". It has no shape but manifests as haunting music.

Tulzscha

Tulzscha (The Green Flame) is the name given in the Malleus Monstrorum Call of Cthulhu roleplay game guide to the entity described in H. P. Lovecraft's story "The Festival". Tulzscha appears as a blazing green ball of flame, dancing with its Lesser Outer Gods at the court of Azathoth. Called to our world, it assumes a gaseous form, penetrates the planet to the core, then erupts from below as a pillar of flame. It cannot move from where it emerges.

Ubbo-Sathla

Uvhash

Uvhash (The Blood-Mad God of the Void) appears as a colossal, vampiric, red mass of both tentacles and eyes. It dwells within the realm of Rhylkos, which matches with the red planet Mars, and whoever summons Uvhash witnesses an atrocious death. He has affinities with the star vampires, and is rumored to have been one of mad emperor Caligula's eldritch sponsors as well. There is enmity with both the Elder God Nodens and the Great Old One Gi-Hoveg.

Xa'ligha

Xa'ligha (Master of the Twisted Sound or Demon of Dissonance) is an entity made of maddening sound, somehow similar to Tru'Nembra. There is some affinity with the Great Old One Hastur.

Xexanoth

Xexanoth is a fictional character from Clark Ashton Smith's Cthulhu Mythos work. It appears only once in "The Chain of Aforgomon", where it is summoned by the main character. Apparently, Xexanoth is the bane and mortal enemy of the time god Aforgomon and, because of Aforgomon likely being an avatar of the Outer God Yog-Sothoth, is probably an Elder or Outer God.

Ycnàgnnisssz

Ycnàgnnisssz is a black, festering, amorphous mass that constantly blasts and erupts violently, spewing out bits of churning lava-like material. She spawned the Great Old One Zstylzhemgni.

Yhoundeh

Yibb-Tstll

A gigantic, bat-winged humanoid with detached eyes, wearing a green robe, this horrible deity sees all time and space as it slowly rotates in the centre of its clearing within the Jungle of Kled in Earth's Dreamlands. Beneath its billowing cloak are a multitude of nightgaunts, suckling and clutching at its breasts. Having a close connection to the Great Old One Bugg-Shash, so should Yibb-Tstll be regarded as a Great Old One—specifically in the Drowners group introduced by Brian Lumley, parasitic alien entities which thrive by vampyrizing the Great Old Ones themselves - though in RPG materials she is classed as an "Outer God".

Yidhra

Yidhra (The Dream Witch or Yee-Tho-Rah) usually appears as a youthful, attractive, earthly female, though her shape may vary.

Yidhra has been on Earth since the first microorganisms appeared and is immortal. To survive in a changing environment, she gained the ability to take on the characteristics of any creature that she devoured. Over time, Yidhra split herself into different aspects, though each part shares her consciousness.

Yidhra is served by devoted cults found in such widely separated places as Myanmar, Chad, Laos, Sumer, New Mexico, and Texas. Members of Yidhra's cult can gain immortality by merging with her, though they become somewhat like Yidhra as a consequence. Those who serve her are also promised plentiful harvests and healthy livestock. She usually conceals her true form behind a powerful illusion, appearing as a comely young woman; only favored members of her cult can see her as she actually is.

Yomagn'tho
Yomagn'tho (The Feaster from the Stars, That Which Relentlessly Waits Outside) is a malevolent being who wishes nothing more than the destruction of humanity for unknown reasons. He waits in his home dimension in Pherkard, until he is summoned to Earth. When first summoned, Yomagn'tho appears as a small ball of fire that quickly expands to a large circle of fire with three flaming inner petals. The reptilian burrowing folk, the Rhygntu, are known to worship this malignant deity.

Elder Gods
In post-Lovecraft stories, the Elder Gods oppose the likes of Cthulhu. Derleth attempted to retroactively group the benevolent deity Nodens in this category (who acts as deus ex machina for the protagonists in both The Dream-Quest of Unknown Kadath and "The Strange High House in the Mist"). Joseph S. Pulver mentions in his Nightmare's Disciple (2006) a set of original Elder Gods, but offers no descriptions of their true forms. The story introduces entities as Adaedu, Alithlai-Tyy, Dveahtehs, Eyroix, Ovytonv, Urthuvn, Xislanyx and Xuthyos-Sihb’Bz. Others have a cult title as Othkkartho (Sire of the Four Titans of Balance and Order), which is said to be Nodens's son, and Zehirete, who is The Pure and Holy Womb of Light. Sk'tai and Eppirfon are both siblings. Eppirfon was originally Cthulhu's second bride who bore him a son, T'ith, now dead, murdered by Cthulhu himself.

Known Elder Gods in the Mythos
The following is another Elder God with no description: Walter C. DeBill, Jr.'s Paighon, an extra-galactic entity which now dwells in Earth's core, said to be inimical to the Outer God Ngyr-Korath and his servitor Ymnar.

Bast
Bast (Goddess of Cats or Pasht) appears as a female human with a cat's head. Likely named after the ancient Egyptian goddess Bastet.

Hypnos
An ambiguous deity regarded as an Elder God. First appeared in Lovecraft's short story "Hypnos".

Kthanid
A creation of Brian Lumley, Kthanid is a sibling of Cthulhu. It looks the same as Cthulhu except for eye colour.

Oryx
Oryx was introduced without name in August Derleth's "The Lair of the Star-Spawn" (1932). The name Oryx is given in the Call of Cthulhu RPG supplement "The Creature Companion" (The Bright Flame) and manifests as a giant pillar of blinding white and purple flames. Although its expression is bright and blinding, no one feels its heat. No one can look at Oryx more than a few seconds; after the first glance, the eyes of anyone who looks become sore and watery.

Oztalun
Oztalun (Golden and Shimmering One) is an Elder God introduced by James Ambuehl. It is symbolized by a seven-pointed star symbol, which is his own Seal.

Nodens
Nodens ("Lord of the Great Abyss") appears as a human male riding a huge seashell pulled by legendary beasts. In CthulhuTech supplements, Nodens is said to be the avatar of the Forgotten One Savty'ya.

Shavalyoth
Shavalyoth (Shadowy and Shapeless One) is an Elder God introduced by James Ambuehl, supposed to be dark and formless.

Ulthar
Ulthar (or Uldar and also Ultharathotep) is a deity sent to Earth to hold vigil over the Great Old Ones.

Vorvadoss
Vorvadoss* (The Flaming One, Lord of the Universal Spaces, The Troubler of the Sands, Who Waiteth in the Outer Dark) appears as a cloaked, hooded being, enveloped in green flames, with fiery eyes. He is described as a son of both the Elder God Nodens and the Great Old One Lythalia and has a twin brother, Yaggdytha.

Yad-Thaddag
Another Brian Lumley deity. Has the same appearance as Yog-Sothoth, except its spheres are of a different color and its nature is purely benevolent.

Yaggdytha
Yaggdytha ("The Incandescent One") is twin brother of Vorvadoss, manifesting as a great, amorphous, incandescent ball of cyan living energy, spreading itself into a web of giant talons of light.

Yog-Sothoth

The cosmic entity Yog-Sothoth was first mentioned in The Case of Charles Dexter Ward (written 1927, first published 1941). The being is said to take the form of a conglomeration of glowing spheres. It is an all-knowing deity, which means it knows the past, present, and future, and its nature is different from any other class of Cthulhu Mythos deities. Yog-Sothoth is coterminous with all time and space, yet is supposedly locked outside of the universe we inhabit. Its cosmic nature is hinted at in this passage from "Through the Gates of the Silver Key" (1934) by Lovecraft and E. Hoffmann Price:
It was an All-in-One and One-in-All of limitless being and self—not merely a thing of one Space-Time continuum, but allied to the ultimate animating essence of existence's whole unbounded sweep—the last, utter sweep which has no confines and which outreaches fancy and mathematics alike. It was perhaps that which certain secret cults of earth have whispered of as YOG-SOTHOTH, and which has been a deity under other names; that which the crustaceans of Yuggoth worship as the Beyond-One, and which the vaporous brains of the spiral nebulae know by an untranslatable Sign...

Yog-Sothoth sees all and knows all. To "please" this deity could bring knowledge of many things. However, like most beings in the mythos, to see it or learn too much about it is to court disaster. Some authors state that the favor of the god requires a human sacrifice or eternal servitude.

According to the genealogy Howard Phillips Lovecraft devised for his characters (later published as "Letter 617" in Selected Letters''), Yog-Sothoth is the offspring of the Nameless Mists, which were born of the deity Azathoth. Yog-Sothoth mated with Shub-Niggurath to produce the twin deities Nug and Yeb, while Nug sired Cthulhu through parthenogenesis. In Lovecraft's short story "The Dunwich Horror", Yog-Sothoth impregnates a mortal woman, Lavinia Whateley, who then gives birth to twin sons: the humanoid Wilbur Whateley and his more monstrous unnamed brother.

In Anders Fager's short story "Grandmother's Journey", a tribe of dog or wolf-like humans (analog to the "ghouls" of the Lovecraftian mythos) is said to have sacrificed to Yog-Sothoth to become "different". In Fager's "Herr Goering's Artifact", Yog-Sothoth is invoked to protect a couple of witches from Father Dagon.

Yog-Sothoth has some connection to the mysterious Old Ones mentioned in "The Dunwich Horror" (1929), but their nature, their number, and their connection to Yog-Sothoth are unknown. Nonetheless, they are probably allied to him in some way, since Wilbur Whateley, the half-human son of Yog-Sothoth, tried to summon them so that they could control Wilbur's more tainted twin and make it reproduce.

At the end of Lovecraft's last story "The Haunter of the Dark", the protagonist Robert Blake calls on Yog-Sothoth to save him from the eponymous malign entity that he has let loose.

See also
 Cthulhu Mythos
 Cthulhu Mythos in popular culture

References

Bibliography
 
 
 

 
 

 
Lists of fictional deities